Lidingöloppet is an annual cross country running competition held in Lidingö, Sweden. The 30 km run has about 15,000 participants per year and the shorter races several thousands, making it the largest cross-country event in the world. It is held the last weekend of September each year.

The initiative to arrange Lidingöloppet came from Karl Axel Karlberg and Sven Gärderud but the original idea to have a large competition for the average jogger comparable with Vasaloppet for cross country skiers, came from the sports magazine journalist Sven Lindhagen. In the first competition 1965, the number of participants was 644. The number of competitors grew rapidly as well as professional runners and has during the 2010s stabilized around 40,000 participants. In the 2022 competition the number of participants was 23,265. It is a tradition that long distance runners studying at Bosön sports training and education center participate at Lidingö. Tata Consultancy Services, a major IT company from India, is currently the primary sponsor of this event.

Winners 
Course records with green background.

Men 30 km

Women 30 km 

Note: Although women were allowed to enter the 30 km before 1996, they had no competition class thus no winner was selected.

Women 10 km

Women 15 km

References

List of winners
Civai, Franco & Fält, Birger (2011-09-28). Lidingoloppet 30 km + 10 km. Association of Road Racing Statisticians. Retrieved on 2012-01-09.

External links

Lidingöloppet official website (press flag for English or Finnish).
Lidingöloppet viewed in Google earth. (Requires free software installed).
Map showing the running tracks of Lidingöloppet (PDF-file, 467 kByte).
The event at SVT's open archive 

International athletics competitions hosted by Sweden
Cross country running competitions
Recurring sporting events established in 1965
1965 establishments in Sweden
Swedish Classic Circuit
September sporting events
Cross country running in Sweden
Annual sporting events in Sweden
Autumn events in Sweden